Upper Broughton or Broughton-Sulney or Over-Broughton is a village and civil parish about seven miles north west of Melton Mowbray, in the Rushcliffe district of the county of Nottinghamshire, England. In 2011 the built-up area had a population of 327, the same as the parish. The parish touches Wymeswold, Hickling, Widmerpool, Broughton and Old Dalby and Willoughby on the Wolds. Upper Broughton is a conservation area that was designated in 1973 and is 16 hectares. It is near the boundary with Leicestershire, and  Nether Broughton is across the county boundary.

Features 
There are 16 listed buildings in Upper Broughton, of which St Luke's Church is Grade I listed.

Upper Broughton has a village hall, on Melton Road (A606) near the junction with Bottom Green.

For many years there was a pub on Main Street, originally called the Golden Fleece and latterly the Tap and Run co-owned by Stuart Broad and Harry Gurney, but this was badly damaged by fire in June 2022.

Upper Broughton railway station opened in 1880 and closed in 1948.

History 
The name "Broughton" means 'Farm by the brook'. Upper Broughton was recorded in the Domesday Book as Brotone. On the 1st of April 1965 an area of Broughton and Old Dalby parish was transferred to the parish. The transferred area was 21 acres. The parish was part of the Bingham Wapentake. "Broughton Sulney" is another name for the parish.

References

External links 

 

Villages in Nottinghamshire
Civil parishes in Nottinghamshire
Rushcliffe